Selman Uranues is an Austrian physician and professor of surgery at the Medical University of Graz. He is known for his work in the fields of minimally invasive surgery, spleen-, gastrointestinal- and acute surgery    and visceral traumatology.

Biography 
Selman Uranues received his degree in 1981 from the Medical University of Graz and board certification in surgery in 1988. Upon acceptance of his postgraduate thesis he advanced to the rank of lecturer in general surgery at the same institution in 1990, and then to professor of surgery in 1996. In that same year, he was named director of the Section for Surgical Research.

He has held visiting professorships in surgery at the Hospital of the University of Pennsylvania, Philadelphia USA, at the Charles University in Prague, Czech Republic, Allegheny General Hospital, Pittsburgh, USA, University of Southern California, Los Angeles, USA, John Hunter Hospital of the University of Newcastle, Australia and the  University of the Witwatersrand, Chris Hani Baragwanath Hospital, Johannesburg, South Africa.

Scientific contribution 

Selman Uranues has acquired an international reputation on the basis of his work in minimally invasive surgery, visceral traumatology and acute surgery. His early interest in surgical research coincided with the introduction of laparoscopy and minimally invasive surgery. Based on his experimental studies and on the growing demand for clinical application of ever smaller instruments and sophisticated techniques, including virtual reality and robotics, of which he was an earl proponent, he played a leading role in the development of this field. He has since gone on to advanced work in reduced port and endoscopic surgery, where there is enormous potential for future reduction of surgical trauma. He was one of the first to advocate the preservation of the spleen in trauma cases.

In this context, he played a pioneering role in developing laparoscopic techniques to preserve the spleen and pancreas, publishing one of the first papers on laparoscopic partial removal of the pancreas preserving the spleen and essential blood vessels. Other scientific work focuses on the application of laparoscopy in diagnostics and the therapy of reflux surgery.

Honors and awards 
 1990 Science Prize of the Steirische Ärztekammer
 1991 Science Prize of the Steirische Ärztekammer
 2008 3rd place of "ebiz e-government award 2008 Steiermark" for the project "Virtual surgery techniques in surgery", Graz
 2012 Innovation prize of the Familie Klee Stiftung, Frankfurt, Germany
 2014 Honorary doctorate from the University of Bucharest
 2014 Visiting Professor Shanghai Jiao Tong University. Affiliated First People's Hospital

Publications

Books 
 with Hans-Jörg Oestern, Otmar Trentz: Head, thoracic, abdominal and vascular injuries. Band 1, Springer, Heidelberg u. a. 2011.
 with Hans-Jörg Oestern, Otmar Trentz: General Trauma Care and Related Aspects. Band 2, Springer, Heidelberg u.a. 2014.
 with Hans-Jörg Oestern, Otmar Trentz: Bone and Joint Injuries. Band 3, Springer, Heidelberg u. a. 2014.

External links 
 Interview with Prof. Uranues after receiving an honorary doctorate from the University of Bucharest, Romania 2014

References 

21st-century Austrian physicians
Austrian surgeons
Living people
Year of birth missing (living people)